Georges Marie Anne (9 October 1906 – 21 February 2001) was a politician from Martinique who was elected to the French Senate in 1959.

References 
 page on the French Senate website

Martiniquais politicians
French people of Martiniquais descent
French Senators of the Fifth Republic
1906 births
2001 deaths
Senators of Martinique